Because water transport is an important industry on the rivers of the Mississippi River system, there are a number of 
fireboats on the Mississippi River system.

Since al Qaeda's attacks within the Continental United States on September 11th, 2001, the Department of Homeland Security has provided generous FEMA Port Security Grants to build new fireboats.

References 

Fireboats
Mississippi River